Sergiu Hart (born 1949) is an Israeli mathematician and economist. He is the Chairperson of the Humanities Division of the Israel Academy of Sciences and Humanities, and the past President of the Game Theory Society (2008–2010). He also is emeritus professor of mathematics at the Kusiel-Vorreuter University Professor, and the emeritus professor of economics at the Center for the Study of Rationality at the Hebrew University of Jerusalem in Israel.

Biography
Hart was born in Bucharest, Romania and immigrated to Israel in 1963. He received a B.Sc. in mathematics and statistics (summa cum laude, 1970) and an M.Sc. in mathematics (summa cum laude, 1971) from Tel Aviv University. His M.Sc. thesis was on the subject of "Values of Mixed Games" and was supervised by Robert Aumann, who was also his advisor in his doctoral thesis on "Cooperative Game Theory Models of Economic Equilibrium" (Ph.D., summa cum laude, 1976).

In 1979–1991 he was at the School of Mathematical Sciences of Tel Aviv University, as professor since 1985. He was an assistant professor at the Department of Economics, Department of Operations Research, and Institute for Mathematical Studies in the Social Sciences at Stanford University (1976–1979), and a visiting professor at the Department of Economics of Harvard University (1984–1985 and 1990–1991). Since 1991 he is a member of the Departments of Economics and Mathematics at the Hebrew University of Jerusalem, and he was the founding director of the Center for the Study of Rationality (1991–1999) there.

Research contributions
His main area of research is game theory and economic theory, with additional contributions in mathematics, computer science, probability and statistics.

Among his major contributions are studies of strategic foundations of cooperation; strategic use of information in long-term interactions ("repeated games"); adaptive and evolutionary dynamics, particularly with boundedly rational agents; perfect economic competition and its relations to models of fair distribution; and riskiness.

Hart edited, with Robert J. Aumann, the first three volumes of the Handbook of Game Theory with Economic Applications (1992, 1994, 2002).

Awards and honors
In 1985, he became the fellow of the Econometric Society.  

In 1999, he became the charter member of the Game Theory Society. 

From 2000 to 2005, he became the Member of the First Council of the Game Theory Society. 

In 2006, he became the member of the Israel Academy of Sciences and Humanities. 

In 2012, he became the member of Academia Europaea.

In 2013, he became the fellow of the Society for the Advancement of Economic Theory.

In 2016, he became the Foreign Honorary Member of the American Academy of Arts and Sciences. 

In 2017, he became the Fellow of the Game Theory Society and the member of the Advisory Board of the Game Theory Society. 

In 2019, he became the Chairperson of the Humanities Division of the Israel Academy of Sciences and Humanities. 

In 1975, he was awarded the Israel Defense Prize. 

In 1998, he was award the Rothschild Prize in the Social Sciences., 

In 2018, he was award the Israel Prize in Economics and Statistics.

In 2020, he was award the ACM SIGecom Test of Time Award.

In 2000, he was invited to give the Cowles Lecture at Yale University. 

In 2003, he was invited to give the Walras-Bowley Lecture of the Econometric Society. 

In 2008, Presidential Address, GAMES 2008 - The Third World Congress of the Game Theory Societ. 

In 2009, he was invited to give the Harris Lecture at Harvard University.

In 2011, he was invited to the Kwan Chao-Chih Distinguished Lecture, Academy of Mathematics and Systems Science, Chinese Academy    of Sciences, Beijing. 

In 2012, he was invited to give the Algorithms, Combinatorics, and Optimization (ACO) Distinguished Lecture at Georgia Institute of Technology. 

In 2013, he was invited to give the Don Patinkin Lecture at the Israeli Economic Association. 

From 2000 to 2005, he became a member of the First Council of the Game Theory Society. 

From 2005 to 2006, he became the president of the Israel Mathematical Union.

From 2006 to 2008, he became the executive vice-president of the Game Theory Society.

From 2008 to 2010, he became the president of the Game Theory Society.

From 1991 to 2007, he became the member of the Academic Committee, Center for the Study of Rationality, The Hebrew University of Jerusalem.

From 2020, he became the member of the Academic Committee, Center for the Study of Rationality, The Hebrew University of Jerusalem.

From 2010 to 2015, he was award ERC (European Research Council) Advanced Investigator Grant.

References

External links
 Hart’s homepage
 

1949 births
Living people
Israeli mathematicians
Israel Defense Prize recipients
Jewish scientists
Israeli economists
Game theorists
Fellows of the Econometric Society
Academic staff of the Hebrew University of Jerusalem
Members of the Israel Academy of Sciences and Humanities
Romanian emigrants to Israel
Fellows of the American Academy of Arts and Sciences
Israel Prize in economics recipients
Scientists from Bucharest